Krystyna Rokiczana (died after 1365) was the third wife of Casimir III the Great, of Poland. Since she was the King's third wife in morganatic marriage, she was not a queen consort.

Life 
Krystyna is mentioned in several historical sources, including the Spominki o Ciołkach ("Mentions about the Ciołek noble family", 1518), she is also mentioned in documents regarding the annulment of Casimir's loveless marriage to Adelaide of Hesse. Krystyna was the widow of Mikuláš (Mikulasz) Rokiczan, a merchant from Prague. When her husband died, Krystyna inherited a large fortune. Krystyna became a lady-in-waiting at the court of Charles IV, Holy Roman Emperor and King of Bohemia.

In May 1356 Casimir III came to Prague, where he met Christina and they possibly became engaged. The marriage was concluded shortly afterwards in Krakow. The marriage is believed not to have lasted long; Jan Długosz reported that Krystyna was dismissed from the king shortly after the marriage after the discovery of concealed defects, Christina was suffering from hair loss and scabies, it is possible, however, that the relationship lasted a bit longer, an investigation found that Christina was still alive in 1365 and was living in Poland. Casimir married for a fourth and final time to Hedwig of Sagan in 1365. This marriage was considered bigamous, with Adelaide still alive and Christina possibly still alive. Casimir and Hedwig had four daughters, they were all considered illegitimate until Casimir had them legitimised. Casimir and Krystyna had no children.

The marriage between Casimir and Krystyna was particularly beneficial for the House of Anjou; children that could have come from the marriage of Casimir and Christina would be considered illegitimate and even if they were legitimised, their legitimacy would still be in question due to Krystyna's low station. Without sons, Casimir had to give the throne to his sister, Elisabeth of Poland and her son, Louis I of Hungary.

It is unknown when Krystyna died.

Krystyna in literature 
Krystyna plays a major role in the novel King of the peasants (1884), by Józef Ignacy Kraszewski. The book is about the history of marriage. Krystyna portrayed as wealthy due to her inheritance from her first husband, well educated, her first husband was a much older man, and her appearance was characterized as the following: snow white complexion, brown hair and eyes, facial features that are strangely beautiful and dignified, she rarely smiled, and when forced to speak through her coral lips, her eyes rarely said anything about her internal emotions.

Bibliography 
Jerzy Wyrozumski, Rokiczana Krystyna, In: Polski Słownik Biograficzny, Volume XXXI, 1989
Jerzy Wyrozumski, Kazimierz Wielki, Ossolineum, Wroclaw 1982

References

Piast dynasty
Casimir III the Great
14th-century Polish people
14th-century Polish women
Polish ladies-in-waiting
Date of birth unknown
Year of birth uncertain
Year of death unknown
Date of death unknown
Morganatic spouses